The 32nd Norwegian Biathlon Championships were held in Myrkdalen, Voss, Hordaland, Norway from 1 March to 4 March 1990 at the stadium Årmotslia skisenter, arranged by Voss SSL. There were 6 scheduled competitions: individual, sprint, and relay races for men and women. The team races for men and women, arranged by Dombås IL, were held concurrently with the final races of the Norwegian Biathlon Cup (Norgescupen) in Dombås, Oppland on 25 March, at the stadium Dombås skiskytterstadion.

Schedule
All times are local (UTC+1).

Medal winners

Men

Women

References

Norwegian Biathlon Championships
1990 in biathlon
1990 in Norwegian sport